Walter Aveyard (11 June 1918 – 16 July 1985) was an English footballer who made more than 100 appearances in the Football League, playing for Sheffield Wednesday, Birmingham City, Port Vale and Accrington Stanley.

Career
Aveyard was born in Hemsworth, Yorkshire. He played football for Denaby United before turning professional with Sheffield Wednesday in 1938, but the Second World War interrupted his career before he played for the first-team. When competitive football resumed after the war, Aveyard made his first-team debut in the 1945–46 FA Cup, scoring twice in six games, but played only four league games in the 1946–47 season, in which he scored three goals, before leaving for Birmingham City in April 1947. He made a promising start, scoring the only goal of his debut match against Coventry City in August 1947 and two more goals, including another winner, in his next three games, but a thigh injury meant he missed most of the season, and he was allowed to join Port Vale in June 1948.

He scored on his debut in a 1–1 draw at Millwall on 21 August 1948. He quickly established himself in the first team and became the club's top scorer for the 1948–49 season with 13 goals. He has the honour of being the first player to score at Vale Park, in a 1–0 win over Newport County on 24 August 1950. However he lost his place in the side by September 1951 and was sold to Accrington Stanley for a four-figure fee in March 1952.

Aveyard scored on debut yet again, but his form deserted him. At the end of his first complete season, Stanley finished bottom of the Third Division North and put him on the transfer list, priced at £1000, but there were no offers. He retired from professional football in the summer of 1953.

Aveyard died in Blackpool, Lancashire, in 1985.

Career statistics
Source:

References

1918 births
1985 deaths
People from Hemsworth
English footballers
Association football forwards
Denaby United F.C. players
Sheffield Wednesday F.C. players
Birmingham City F.C. players
Port Vale F.C. players
Accrington Stanley F.C. (1891) players
English Football League players